Sarah Virginia Brinton, Baroness Brinton (born 1 April 1955), known as Sal Brinton, is a British politician who served as president of the Liberal Democrats from 2015 to 2020. In November 2010 she was nominated to the House of Lords, taking her place on 10 February 2011 having been created Baroness Brinton, of Kenardington in the County of Kent on 4 February. After Jo Swinson lost her seat at the 2019 United Kingdom general election, Brinton and Sir Ed Davey became acting co-leaders of the Liberal Democrats.

Early life and education
Brinton was born in Paddington, London, in 1955. She is the daughter of former Conservative MP Tim Brinton, and the cousin of Mary Stocks, Baroness Stocks.

Brinton was educated at Benenden School and studied stage management at the Central School of Speech and Drama. She subsequently completed a degree in English literature at Churchill College, Cambridge, in 1981.

Career
Beginning her career in the mid 1970s at the BBC as a television floor manager, working on programmes including Playschool, Grandstand and Doctor Who, Brinton joined the Liberal Party in 1975 and became a Cambridgeshire County Councillor in 1993. She contested the parliamentary seat of South East Cambridgeshire at the 1997 and 2001 general elections.

Brinton was bursar of Lucy Cavendish College, Cambridge, from 1992 to 1997, and Selwyn College, Cambridge, from 1997 to 2002. In 1997 she won the East Anglian entrepreneurial businesswoman of the year award. She was also founder member of the Board of the East of England Development Agency from December 1998 to December 2004 (Deputy Chair from 2001 to 2004).

From 1999 to 2004, Brinton chaired the Cambridgeshire Learning and Skills Council. She contested the Watford constituency at the 2005 and 2010 General Elections coming second to Labour and the Conservatives respectively. She is a non-executive director of the Ufi Charitable Trust, a charity giving grants in the vocational educational technology sector.

Brinton is a member of the Liberal Democrat Federal Policy Committee and Vice Chair of the Federal Conference Committee. She also chairs the Liberal Democrat Diversity Engagement Group and has a particular interest in increasing the number of women, black, Asian, and minority ethnic MPs. Baroness Brinton was a member of the All Party Stalking Inquiry of 2011.

In 2014, Brinton was elected as the president of the Liberal Democrats, defeating Daisy Cooper and Liz Lynne, and took up her position on 1 January 2015.

Personal life
Brinton has rheumatoid arthritis and so usually uses a wheelchair. She met her husband Tim when she worked at the BBC. Brinton lives with Tim and their family in Watford.

Honours
In 2003, Brinton was awarded an honorary PhD for her contribution to education, skills and learning by Anglia Ruskin University. In November 2013, she was made a Fellow of Birkbeck, University of London. She is Patron of Christian Blind Mission UK, Trustee of the United Kingdom Committee of UNICEF, a Trustee of the Ufi Charitable Trust, and a Director of the Joseph Rowntree Reform Trust Ltd.

References

External links

Baroness Brinton Profile at the site of Liberal Democrats
Guardian – Sal Brinton: Electoral History and Profile

1955 births
Alumni of Churchill College, Cambridge
Councillors in Cambridgeshire
Fellows of Selwyn College, Cambridge
Life peeresses created by Elizabeth II
Liberal Democrats (UK) councillors
Liberal Democrats (UK) life peers
Liberal Democrats (UK) parliamentary candidates
Living people
People educated at Benenden School
Politics of Watford
20th-century British women politicians
21st-century British women politicians
Leaders of the Liberal Democrats (UK)